Monoamine oxidase inhibitors (MAOIs) are a class of drugs that inhibit the activity of one or both monoamine oxidase enzymes: monoamine oxidase A (MAO-A) and monoamine oxidase B (MAO-B). They are best known as effective antidepressants, especially for treatment-resistant depression and atypical depression. They are also used to treat panic disorder, social anxiety disorder, Parkinson's disease, and several other disorders.

Reversible inhibitors of monoamine oxidase A (RIMAs) are a subclass of MAOIs that selectively and reversibly inhibit the MAO-A enzyme. RIMAs are used clinically in the treatment of depression and dysthymia.  Due to their reversibility, they are safer in single-drug overdose than the older, irreversible MAOIs, and weaker in increasing the monoamines important in depressive disorder. RIMAs have not gained widespread market share in the United States.

Medical uses

MAOIs have been found to be effective in the treatment of panic disorder with agoraphobia, social phobia, atypical depression or mixed anxiety disorder and depression, bulimia, and post-traumatic stress disorder, as well as borderline personality disorder, and obsessive–compulsive disorder (OCD). MAOIs appear to be particularly effective in the management of bipolar depression according to a retrospective-analysis from 2009. There are reports of MAOI efficacy in OCD, trichotillomania, body dysmorphic disorder, and avoidant personality disorder, but these reports are from uncontrolled case reports.

MAOIs can also be used in the treatment of Parkinson's disease by targeting MAO-B in particular (therefore affecting dopaminergic neurons), as well as providing an alternative for migraine prophylaxis. Inhibition of both MAO-A and MAO-B is used in the treatment of clinical depression and anxiety.

MAOIs appear to be particularly indicated for outpatients with dysthymia complicated by panic disorder or hysteroid dysphoria

Newer MAOIs such as selegiline (typically used in the treatment of Parkinson's disease) and the reversible MAOI  moclobemide provide a safer alternative and are now sometimes used as first-line therapy.

Side effects

Hypertensive crisis
People taking MAOIs generally need to change their diets to limit or avoid foods and beverages containing tyramine, which is found in products such as cheese, soy sauce, and salami. If large amounts of tyramine are consumed, they may develop a hypertensive crisis, which can be fatal. Examples of foods and beverages with potentially high levels of tyramine include animal liver and fermented substances, such as alcoholic beverages and aged cheeses. Excessive concentrations of tyramine in blood plasma can lead to hypertensive crisis by increasing the release of norepinephrine (NE), which causes blood vessels to constrict by activating alpha-1 adrenergic receptors. Ordinarily, MAO-A would destroy the excess NE; when MAO-A is inhibited, however, NE levels get too high, leading to dangerous increases in blood pressure.

RIMAs are displaced from MAO-A in the presence of tyramine, rather than inhibiting its breakdown in the liver as general MAOIs do. Additionally, MAO-B remains free and continues to metabolize tyramine in the stomach, although this is less significant than the liver action. Thus, RIMAs are unlikely to elicit tyramine-mediated hypertensive crisis; moreover, dietary modifications are not usually necessary when taking a reversible inhibitor of MAO-A (i.e., moclobemide) or low doses of selective MAO-B inhibitors (e.g., selegiline 6 mg/24 hours transdermal patch).

Drug interactions 
The most significant risk associated with the use of MAOIs is the potential for drug interactions with over-the-counter, prescription, or illegally obtained medications, and some dietary supplements (e.g., St. John's wort, tryptophan). It is vital that a doctor supervise such combinations to avoid adverse reactions. For this reason, many users carry an MAOI-card, which lets emergency medical personnel know what drugs to avoid (e.g. adrenaline [epinephrine] dosage should be reduced by 75%, and duration is extended.)

Tryptophan supplements can be consumed with MAOIs, but can result in transient serotonin syndrome.

MAOIs should not be combined with other psychoactive substances (antidepressants, painkillers, stimulants, including prescribed, OTC and illegally acquired drugs, etc.) except under expert care. Certain combinations can cause lethal reactions; common examples including SSRIs, tricyclics, MDMA, meperidine, tramadol, dextromethorphan, whereas combinations with LSD, psilocybin, or DMT appear to be relatively safe  . Drugs that affect the release or reuptake of epinephrine, norepinephrine, serotonin or dopamine typically need to be administered at lower doses due to the resulting potentiated and prolonged effect.  MAOIs also interact with tobacco-containing products (e.g. cigarettes) and may potentiate the effects of certain compounds in tobacco. This may be reflected in the difficulty of smoking cessation, as tobacco contains naturally occurring MAOI compounds in addition to the nicotine.

While safer than general MAOIs,  still possess significant and potentially serious drug interactions with many common drugs; in particular, they can cause serotonin syndrome or hypertensive crisis when combined with almost any antidepressant or stimulant, common migraine medications, certain herbs, or most cold medicines (including decongestants, antihistamines, and cough syrup).

Ocular alpha-2 agonists such as brimonidine and apraclonidine are glaucoma medications which reduce intraocular pressure by decreasing aqueous production.  These alpha-2 agonists should not be given with oral MAOIs due to the risk of hypertensive crisis.

Withdrawal 
Antidepressants including MAOIs have some dependence-producing effects, the most notable one being a discontinuation syndrome, which may be severe especially if MAOIs are discontinued abruptly or too rapidly. The dependence-producing potential of MAOIs or antidepressants in general is not as significant as benzodiazepines, however. Discontinuation symptoms can be managed by a gradual reduction in dosage over a period of days, weeks or sometimes months to minimize or prevent withdrawal symptoms.

MAOIs, as with most antidepressant medication, may not alter the course of the disorder in a significant, permanent way, so it is possible that discontinuation can return the patient to the pre-treatment state. This consideration complicates prescribing between an MAOI and an SSRI, because it is necessary to clear the system completely of one drug before starting another. One physician organization recommends the dose to be tapered down over a minimum of four weeks, followed by a two-week washout period. The result is that a depressed patient will have to bear the depression without chemical help during the drug-free interval. This may be preferable to risking the effects of an interaction between the two drugs.

Mechanism of action 

MAOIs act by inhibiting the activity of monoamine oxidase, thus preventing the breakdown of monoamine neurotransmitters and thereby increasing their availability. There are two isoforms of monoamine oxidase, MAO-A and MAO-B. MAO-A preferentially deaminates serotonin, melatonin, epinephrine, and norepinephrine. MAO-B preferentially deaminates phenethylamine and certain other trace amines; in contrast, MAO-A preferentially deaminates other trace amines, like tyramine, whereas dopamine is equally deaminated by both types.

Reversibility 
The early MAOIs covalently bound to the monoamine oxidase enzymes, thus inhibiting them irreversibly; the bound enzyme could not function and thus enzyme activity was blocked until the cell made new enzymes. The enzymes turn over approximately every two weeks. A few newer MAOIs, a notable one being moclobemide, are reversible, meaning that they are able to detach from the enzyme to facilitate usual catabolism of the substrate. The level of inhibition in this way is governed by the concentrations of the substrate and the MAOI.

Harmaline found in Peganum harmala, Banisteriopsis caapi, and Passiflora incarnata is a reversible inhibitor of monoamine oxidase A (RIMA).

Selectivity 

In addition to reversibility, MAOIs differ by their selectivity of the MAO enzyme subtype. Some MAOIs inhibit both MAO-A and MAO-B equally, other MAOIs have been developed to target one over the other.

MAO-A inhibition reduces the breakdown of primarily serotonin, norepinephrine, and dopamine; selective inhibition of MAO-A allows for tyramine to be metabolised via MAO-B. Agents that act on serotonin if taken with another serotonin-enhancing agent may result in a potentially fatal interaction called serotonin syndrome or with irreversible and unselective inhibitors (such as older MAOIs), of MAO a hypertensive crisis as a result of tyramine food interactions is particularly problematic with older MAOIs. Tyramine is broken down by MAO-A and MAO-B, therefore inhibiting this action may result in its excessive build-up, so diet must be monitored for tyramine intake.

MAO-B inhibition reduces the breakdown mainly of dopamine and phenethylamine so there are no dietary restrictions associated with this. MAO-B would also metabolize tyramine, as the only differences between dopamine, phenethylamine, and tyramine are two phenylhydroxyl groups on carbons 3 and 4. The 4-OH would not be a steric hindrance to MAO-B on tyramine. Selegiline is selective for MAO-B at low doses, but non-selective at higher doses.

History
The knowledge of MAOIs began with the serendipitous discovery that iproniazid was a potent MAO inhibitor (MAOI). Originally intended for the treatment of tuberculosis, in 1952, iproniazid's antidepressant properties were discovered when researchers noted that the depressed patients given iproniazid experienced a relief of their depression. Subsequent in vitro work led to the discovery that it inhibited MAO and eventually to the monoamine theory of depression.  MAOIs became widely used as antidepressants in the early 1950s. The discovery of the 2 isoenzymes of MAO has led to the development of selective MAOIs that may have a more favorable side-effect profile.

The older MAOIs' heyday was mostly between the years 1957 and 1970. The initial popularity of the 'classic' non-selective irreversible MAO inhibitors began to wane due to their serious interactions with sympathomimetic drugs and tyramine-containing foods that could lead to dangerous hypertensive emergencies. As a result, the use by medical practitioners of these older MAOIs declined. When scientists discovered that there are two different MAO enzymes (MAO-A and MAO-B), they developed selective compounds for MAO-B, (for example, selegiline, which is used for Parkinson's disease), to reduce the side-effects and serious interactions. Further improvement occurred with the development of compounds (moclobemide and toloxatone) that not only are selective but cause reversible MAO-A inhibition and a reduction in dietary and drug interactions. Moclobemide, was the first reversible inhibitor of MAO-A to enter widespread clinical practice.

A transdermal patch form of the MAOI selegiline, called Emsam, was approved for use in depression by the Food and Drug Administration in the United States on 28 February 2006.

List of MAO inhibiting drugs

Marketed MAOIs
 Nonselective MAO-A/MAO-B inhibitors
Hydrazine (antidepressant)
 Iproniazid (Marsilid, Iprozid, Ipronid, Rivivol, Propilniazida) (available in France)
Isocarboxazid (Marplan)
Hydracarbazine
Phenelzine (Nardil, Nardelzine)
 Non-hydrazines
 Tranylcypromine (Parnate, Jatrosom)
 Selective MAO-A inhibitors
 Bifemelane (Alnert, Celeport) (available in Japan)
 Methylthioninium chloride (Urelene blue, Provayblue, Proveblue)
 Moclobemide (Aurorix, Manerix, Moclamine)
 Pirlindole (Pirazidol) (available in Russia)
 Selective MAO-B inhibitors
 Rasagiline (Azilect)
 Selegiline (Deprenyl, Eldepryl, Emsam, Zelapar)
 Safinamide (Xadago)

Linezolid is an antibiotic drug with weak, reversible MAO-inhibiting activity.

Methylthioninium chloride (methylene blue), the antidote indicated for drug-induced methemoglobinemia on the World Health Organization's List of Essential Medicines, among a plethora of other off-label uses, is a highly potent, reversible MAO inhibitor.

The Food and Drug Administration (FDA) has approved these MAOIs to treat depression:

 Isocarboxazid (Marplan)
 Phenelzine (Nardil)
 Selegiline (Emsam)
 Tranylcypromine (Parnate)

MAOIs that have been withdrawn from the market
 Nonselective MAO-A/MAO-B inhibitors
Hydrazines
Benmoxin (Nerusil, Neuralex)
 Iproclozide (Sursum)
 Mebanazine (Actomol)
 Nialamide (Niamid)
Octamoxin (Ximaol, Nimaol)
Pheniprazine (Catron)
Phenoxypropazine (Drazine)
Pivalylbenzhydrazine (Tersavid)
Safrazine (Safra) (discontinued worldwide except for Japan)
 Non-hydrazines
 Caroxazone (Surodil, Timostenil)
Selective MAO-A inhibitors
Minaprine (Cantor)
 Toloxatone (Humoryl)

List of RIMAs 

Marketed pharmaceuticals

 Moclobemide (Aurorix, Manerix, Moclamine)

Other pharmaceuticals

 Brofaromine (Consonar)
 Caroxazone (Surodil, Timostenil)
 Eprobemide (Befol)
 Methylene blue
 Metralindole (Inkazan)
 Minaprine (Cantor)
 Pirlindole (Pirazidol)

Naturally occurring RIMAs in plants
 Curcumin (selectivity for MAO-A and reliability of research on curcumin are disputed)
 Harmaline
 Harmine
 Rosiridin (in vitro)

Research compounds

 Amiflamine (FLA-336)
 Befloxatone (MD-370,503)
 Cimoxatone (MD-780,515)
 Esuprone
 Sercloremine (CGP-4718-A)
 Tetrindole
 CX157 (TriRima)

References 

Antidepressants